Justin James Warnock, commonly known by his stage name Justin James (born May 7, 1975), is a Canadian electronic musician, DJ, educator and label owner. He has become an influential part of Windsor, Ontario and Detroit, Michigan’s Techno scenes.  He is best known for his work with Richie Hawtin’s "Minus" records and Dubfire’s "Sci+Tec" record label,  as well for his DJing techno sets making use of laptop computers and digital mixing equipment. In May 2014, James founded his own record label, Refused.

Early life 

James was born in Windsor, Ontario, Canada and at the age of two moved to Amherstburg, Ontario, a suburb of across the river from Detroit, the birthplace of techno. His father, James, worked as a manager at Chrysler and his mother, Marie-Claire, worked in various financial institutions.  He has one sister, Nicole, who is a teacher.  Love of music was introduced at early age in the household.  James attended St. Thomas of Villanova Secondary School in LaSalle.  Upon graduation he studied Communications Studies at the University of Windsor, focusing on film, video, photography and sound production.  After earning his degree, James continued his education through teachers college earning his Bachelors of Education from the University of Windsor.

In 2011, his track 'Suck My Soul' was featured in the compilation 'New Horizons' by Richie Hawtin along with several Minus's newcomers. In 2012, the track 'City Club' appears on the CD Mix 'A Transmission' by Dubfire, In 2013, Justin released 'Shallow Dreamer' (Sci+Tec), 'Exchange' (Minus), alongside Jorge Ciccioli and NSound. On May 23, his track 'Song So True' was featured on the MINMAX compilation, consolidating James as an  internationally recognized artist.

On July 25, 2015, he performed at Tomorrowland (Boom, Belgium). On October 31 of the same year, he performed at San Bernardino, California for ENTER. LA Escape: All Hallow's Eve. On 2016, he made his debut in The BPM Festival, at The Octopus Recordings Showcase.

Selected discography

Remixes

Appears on

References

External links
Official website
Official RA page

1975 births
Canadian DJs
Canadian electronic musicians
Canadian record producers
Living people
Musicians from Windsor, Ontario